Md Muhsin Alam, ndc, psc, is a Brigadier General in Bangladesh Army. He was the Principal of BKSP in 2012 and served there for two years. He also served as Colonel GS and Deputy Director General of DGFI. Brigadier General Md Muhsin Alam, ndc, psc commanded two infantry battalions of the Bangladesh Army. He also served as Brigade Commander of an Infantry Brigade. The Brigadier was the pioneer Brigade Commander of the only Para Commando Brigade of the Bangladesh Army. In 2019, on behalf of the Para Commando Brigade, Brigadier General Muhsin received the raising flag  from the Prime Minister of Bangladesh, Sheikh Hasina. This entitles him to a  flag officer.  Currently, he serves at D R Congo as the Northern Sector Commander of MONUSCO.

Education and Training 
Md Muhsin Alam was commissioned in the corps of Infantry in June 1991 with 2the 4th BMA Long Course. He has completed a number of courses at home and abroad. The General topped Army Commando Course. He attended Combat Tracking Course from Malaysia, Free Fall Course from China and UN Integrated Mission Staff Officer Course  from Canada.

He is a graduate of Defence Services Command and Staff College (DSCSC), completed his master's degree in Defence Studies (MDS) from National University , and also graduated from National Defence College (NDC). He is an alumnus of Hazrabari High School, Jamalpur, and Notre Dame College, Dhaka.

Military career 
Md Muhsin Alam has served in various command, staff, and instructional appointments. As staff, he served in an Infantry Brigade as General Staff Officer Grade-2 (GSO-2), Colonel GS and Deputy Director General of DGFI and Principal of BKSP.

Chattogram Hill tracts (CHT) 
As a young officer, He served in a battalion of East Bengal Regiment and took part in Operation DABANOL in CHT. During this period, he served in Marishya Zone (Rangamati Hill District). He was Commanding Officer (CO) of a Battalion of Bangladesh Infantry Regiment (BIR). He was also the Zone Commander of Ruma Zone.

He was put in command of   Baghaihat zone overnight to mitigate a particularly sensitive crisis From Ruma Zone he conducted number of Anti Narcotics Operation (Poppy field destruction) in Likri para.

Free Faller 
He is an Active Sky Diver. He has undergone Free Fall Courses in PLA  Airborne School in China. He is the only Officer of the Bangladesh Armed Forces who participated in Free Fall jump at the rank of Brigadier General.

Led The Free Faller Contingent in Victory Day Parade 2021 
16 December 2021 was the  50th Anniversary of Bangladesh's Victory Day and Independence. It was also the Birth centenary of the Father of the Nation Bangabandhu  Shiekh Mujibur Rahman. To commemorate this, 50 brave Free Fallers from Para Commando Brigade jumped. Brigadier General Muhsin led the  Free Faller contingent.  For the first time ever In Bangladesh's history, a Brigadier General jumped in the National Victory Day Parade - which was highly praised and highlighted in the news and social media.

He was also the overall commander of the Para Commando's in the National Victory Day Parade 2021, which included the Ceremonial Parade, SPIE (Special Patrol Insertion and Extraction), Counter Terrorism and lastly - the free faller contingent.

SPIE was introduced for the first time in Bangladesh Army by Brigadier General Muhsin in National Victory  Day Parade 2019.

School of Infantry and Tactics (SI&T) 
Md Muhsin Alam is a veteran instructor of this Institution. At the rank of Lieutenant, he served in Weapon Wing and conducted Young Officers Basic Course - Infantry (YOBC). As a captain, he served in Special Warfare Wing from 1994 to 1996, and as a Major, he served in Special Warfare Wing from 2002 to 2004. He conducted Basic Commando Course (BCC), Army Commando Course (ACC), Counter Insurgency (CI) and jungle warfare (JW) course, tracking course, and free fall courses.

Staff Appointments 
As a Staff, he served as General Staff Officer Grade-2 (GSO-2) of an Independent Infantry Brigade.

Commands 

He commanded two Infantry Battalions, one Special Forces Contingent in UNAMID (Darfur, Sudan), one Infantry brigade, Para Commando Brigade and Northern Sector, MONUSCO.

Exercises 
Md Muhsin Alam has participated in many Joint Exercises, namely Balance Buffalo and Advanced Marksmanship (US Army), Exercise Tiger Shark (US Army), and Exercise Cope South (US Air Force).

As Commander of Para Commando Brigade, he conducted Exercise Tiger Shark on 24 September 2020, a 24-day Joint Counter-Terrorism Training Exercise Bengal Brit (Royal British Army) on and six-day long Exercise Cope South. on 6 February 2020. Under his directive, a week-long customized training was rendered to members of the Crisis Response Team of the Bangladesh Police in June 2021.

Sector Commander, MONUSCO

Training 
Md Muhsin Alam was appointed as the Northern Sector Commander at D R Congo under the banner of MONUSCO. He took over the command of the Northern Sector on 13 January 2022. At the outset of his command, he emphasized training curriculum of his under command units. To ensure the mission mandate he gave importance to training on the protection of civilians and rules of engagement. His prudent guidance enables the northern sector peacekeepers to conduct any operation. Few significant training subjects are riot control, fast roping, forward air controller (FAC) training, rappelling, force protection, counter-ambush, convoy escorting, casualty evacuation, APC driving, defensive driving, robust patrolling et cetera.

Operations 
Brigadier General Muhsin Alam, ndc, psc led many operations against the armed groups within his area of responsibility. Mentionable operations are Operation Uzi Hill – 1, Operation Uzi Hill – 2, Operation Dheja, Operation Bali, and Operation Sake. Under the talented leadership of Brigadier General Muhsin Alam, the armed groups are neutralized in most of the places in the Northern Sector. He could also diffuse the threat posed to civilians. Brigadier General Muhsin ensured the freedom of movement of the local populace within his area of responsibility.

For conducting successful operation against armed groups within the shortest possible time the General received consecutively four letters of commendations for four separate operations. No Sector Commander before was awarded such.

Coordination 
To facilitate the civilian-led stabilization process through projection and presence, Brigadier General Muhsin Alam is assisting the local government and  the local communal leaders. His under-command peacekeepers are supporting and reinforcing local security forces. Continuously Brigadier General Muhsin Alam meets with the local head of the government and the governor. He also maintains a close liaison with the Armed Forces of the Democratic Republic of the Congo (FARDC) leadership. He had several calls on with the FARDC Military Region Commander and Commander, Sector Ops Ituri.

Winning Hearts and Minds 
Brigadier General Muhsin Alam kept up a tactical and operational interaction between the military and the local people to prove that MONUSCO peacekeepers are trustworthy. He is very keen to win the hearts and minds of the Congolese. Under his leadership, the Northern Sector conducted several civil-military cooperation (CIMIC) activities. at D.R. Congo. Brigadier General Muhsin organized several medical campaigns in his area of responsibility. At present, Brigadier General Muhsin Alam is the Chief Patron of a primary school on behalf of the Bangladesh Army, which is named after the Father of the Nation of Bangladesh, “Bangabandhu MBIO Primary School." He also organized training on the computer by donating laptops to the local students and conducted basic paramedic training at the General Hospital in Bunia and self-defeself-defence for the female students at Bunia, D.R. Congo. Brigadier General Muhsin Alam and his under command peacekeepers rendered humanitarian assistance by constructing roads and culverts within his area of responsibility. These roads and culverts are enhancing the local socio-economic development of the DRC. One notable road is the Katoto—Lita—Luna—Djili route. Brigadier General Muhsin made sure that young people in the area had jobs by giving them training in different skills. “The School Promotion Program for Peace 2022”, which was organized organized by Northern Sector, where 64 schools and 21 communities participated, fostered mutual trust and confidence between locals and MONUSCO peacekeepers. In recognition for his actions, he was awarded Force Commander's Commendation on 22 July 22.

Successful Movement Against Anti-MONUSCO Demonstration 
The anti-MONUSCO protest spread throughout the Eastern DRC on July 25, 2022. The agitated Congolese nationals vandalized MONUSCO installations and residences of North Kivu and South Kivu. The protestors violently attacked MONUSCO bases in Goma, Beni and Butembo towns. The Force HQ, Level-3 Hospital, Central Log Base, BANENGR Company, and BANATU were overrun by the frantic protestors. The fierce protest lasted for almost three weeks, during which the civilians could cause remarkable damage to UN personnel, materials, and informationinf these areas. The movement claimed the lives of 36 people, including three MONUSCO members. But no anti-MONUSCO demonstration occurred in Ituri province, the northern section of MONUSCO. This was only possible because of the able leadership, proactive decision-making, and prompt action of the Northern Sector Commander Brigadier General Muhsin.

General Muhsin proactively engaged all tiers of the province, like government, political, religious, youth, student leaders, teachers of colleges and universities, and taxi drivers, to support MONUSCO and work alongside the peacekeepers in the time of crisis. As a result, the situation remained peaceful throughout Ituri province even iduringthe time of intense anti-MONUSCO protests in other provinces of eastern DRC.  t was only possible for the foresighteand viproactiveteps of Brigadier General Muhsin during such a crucial moment. Admittedly, it ensured much credibility of Bangladeshi peacekeepers in United Nations Ppacekeeping Ooerations and uplifted the name and fame of Bangladesh. His contributions were vastly applauded and appreciated by the USG, SRSG, Force Commander and many UN Hhgh Ooficials. It was also published in many newspapers and electronic media of home and abroad. Besides, it was also illustrated in many social media.

Awards and decorations

Personal life 
General Muhsin was born in 1971 and hails from Jamalpur, Bangladesh. He is married and has a son. He is a keen golfer. He also participated in a humanitarian aid drive amid recent COVID-19 pandemic He is an extensive traveler and has visited many countries in both official and personal capacity.

References 

Living people
Bangladesh Army generals
Special forces of Bangladesh
Year of birth missing (living people)
National Defence College (Bangladesh) alumni